The following is a list of episodes of the horror series Friday the 13th: The Series. Starring John D. LeMay, Chris Wiggins, Louise Robey and Steve Monarque. Friday the 13th aired from October 3, 1987 to May 26, 1990 in first-run syndication, for a total of 72 episodes.

Overview

Episodes

Season 1 (1987–88)

Season 2 (1988–89)

Season 3 (1989–90)

See also
 List of Friday the 13th media

External links
 
 

Lists of American drama television series episodes
Lists of Canadian drama television series episodes
Friday the 13th (franchise) mass media
Friday the 13th (franchise) lists
Lists of horror television series episodes